The Free Life Pond is an annex pond of the Han Chinese Buddhist temples. It is usually located in front of the Shanmen or the Hall of Four Heavenly Kings. The Free Life Pond embodies Buddhist thoughts of compassion and understanding of all living beings.

History
The Free Life Pond was firstly mentioned in the Great Treatise on the Perfection of Wisdom, which read: "".

The Free Life Pond was originate erected by Zhiyi, founder of Tiantai school, in the Sui dynasty (589–618). In 759, Emperor Suzong of the Tang dynasty (618–907) ordered all Buddhist temples to set up Free Life Pond. According to Duo Po Ming Jing, at that time, 81 Buddhist temples set up free life ponds under the emperor's command.

Function
The Free Life Pond can regulate the air, inhibit dust, but also has the role of fire prevention. If the Buddhist temple is on fire, the water in the pond can be used to fight the fire.

References

Bibliography

Further reading
 
 
 

Chinese Buddhist architecture